Severe Tropical Cyclone Bola was one of the costliest cyclones in the history of New Zealand, causing severe damage as an extratropical cyclone when it passed near the country in March 1988. It formed on February 24 to the north of Fiji, and tracking generally southwestward it reached hurricane-force winds near Vanuatu on February 28. On March 4, Bola transitioned into an extratropical storm, passing to the north of the North Island of New Zealand on March 8. It weakened further and was absorbed by a stationary trough near the South Island on March 12.

The cyclone first affected Fiji, where it produced gale-force winds and strong waves. In Vanuatu, Bola dropped heavy rainfall, which destroyed two bridges and caused severe damage to islands in the group. Damage totaled over $82 million (1988 USD). Seven people were killed due to flooding, and hundreds were evacuated when a swollen river threatened Wairoa. In Whangaruru Harbour, Northland, an elderly male suffered a heart attack and died during the peak of the storm while attempting to tie down a neighbour's empty water tank. The name Bola was later retired, meaning it will not be used again within the same basin.

Meteorological history

The system was subsequently named Bola by the Fiji Meteorological Service during the next day, after it had become a Category 1 tropical cyclone on the Australian tropical cyclone intensity scale. The system subsequently moved south-westwards which meant that the islands of Maewo and Pentecost were threatened. However, as Bola moved further southwards it entered a region of light and variable wind during February 27, which along with an area of high pressure in the Tasman Sea blocked Bola's movement southwards. By this time Bola had become a category 2 tropical cyclone on the Australian scale, with wind speeds of between  occurring near the centre. During February 28, the system became a Category 3 severe tropical cyclone on the Australian scale, as it performed a small clockwise loop, between the Shepherd Islands and Efate. After completing its first cyclonic loop during February 29, Bola started to move south-eastwards, before it performed a second cyclonic loop during the next day.

After reaching peak intensity, Cyclone Bola quickly weakened as it accelerated southeastward toward a frontal trough. On March 3, its winds dropped below hurricane-force, and it gradually lost its tropical characteristics. The structure became asymmetric, with a large band of clouds extending well south of the circulation. By March 4, Bola had completed the transition into an extratropical cyclone. It then turned south and began to affect the North Island of New Zealand on March 6. A building ridge of high pressure to its south caused the extratropical remnants of Bola to slow and turn to the west on March 7. Around the same time, the storm began slowly filling, meaning the low pressure area associated with Bola was losing its identity. It turned southward on March 9, and on March 12 was absorbed by a stationary trough in the Westerlies near the western coast of the South Island.

Impact

Vanuatu
Cyclone Bola remained near Vanuatu for about a week, during which it reached its peak intensity while executing a cyclonic loop. The most affected locations were Epi island, the Shepherd Islands, and the islands in Malampa Province, and throughout the country the cyclone affected more than 15,000 people and 3,000 houses. Two bridges on Malakula were destroyed, and several other bridges were flooded or damaged. The passage of the cyclone also left several buildings, roads, and crop fields damaged.

Fiji
Fiji was first affected by Bola on February 25, while the system was within its developing stages. The system subsequently affected the island nation for a second time between March 3 and 4. Only very minor damage to sugarcane, pawpaws and other crops was reported, while the Fijian Government decided not to assess the damage caused by Bola. During March 3, an open punt went missing between Kadavu and Vateule with six fishermen on board. All six fishermen were subsequently presumed dead after repeated air searches had failed to find them.

New Zealand

Cyclone Bola created some of the largest rainfall totals for a single storm in the history of New Zealand, with some locations receiving more than half of their annual rainfall totals from the storm. While the cyclone passed north of the island, a strong easterly flow over the North Island contained the interaction between moist air from Bola and drier air from the ridge to its southeast. In the Gisborne region, the flow resulted in the heaviest rainfall totals, when the moisture ascended over the region's western mountainous areas and condensed into precipitation. One station recorded  in a 24‑hour period. The cyclone is the largest to be recorded in 93 years of rainfall records. As such, it had a large and lasting effect on the rivers of the area when it deposited a large amount of sediment, as recorded in the sedimentary record of Lake Tūtira. Shortly prior to losing its identity, the remnants of Bola also dropped  of precipitation on the South Island of New Zealand.

Storm damage was heaviest in Gisborne, where rain destroyed or damaged several roads and bridges. Three days of continuous rainfall led to mudslides, flooding, and erosion. Seven people drowned in the flooding. In Te Karaka in Gisborne, a flooded river forced 500 residents to evacuate. Water supplies were disrupted in two cities due to flooding. Rainfall in Northland Region caused flooding and outages to telephone and power. Additionally, beginning on about 6 March, the cyclone began affecting the North Island with strong easterly winds of over hurricane force, caused by the interaction between the extratropical remnants of Bola and a ridge of high pressure to its south. The winds damaged a few homes, including some in which the roofs were damaged or destroyed. In addition, the strong winds downed several trees, and at the same time, erosion and landslides left hillsides bare without grass or trees. 

Crop and stock losses were high and among the thousands of people who fled three people died when their car was washed away by floodwaters. The government responded with Michael Bassett, the Minister of Civil Defence, flying to Gisborne on 8 March in an air force plane (the airport was closed to normal passenger flights). There he met with Colin Moyle, the Minister of Agriculture, to organise restoring water and food supplies to the area. On 11 March the Prime Minister, David Lange, flew in an air force helicopter to areas north of Gisborne to accompany a mission to drop supplies to stranded people. At the final destination Lange famously was met by a farmers wife wearing a pink nightgown and gumboots who burst into tears of relief when presented with an aid package by Lange. After regular warm summer weather resumed, with fresh running water connection still not fully reestablished, a health scare developed. Lange insisted on having a member of his personal staff in Gisborne, which inadvertently cut across lines of command established by Ed Latter, the Director of Civil Defence, causing confusion. After the dissipation of the cyclone a rebuilding effort was begun in Gisborne which benefitted the town. Agriculture losses amounted to $90 million and the government's repair bill was more than $111 million.

Due to the effects of Cyclone Bola, many farms in Taranaki converted from horticulture to dairy farming.

The Royal New Zealand Navy Frigate HMNZS Waikato sailed from Newcastle Australia to Auckland NZ when all merchant shipping had been stopped and encountered Cyclone Bola in the Tasman Sea. "Waikato" was a day late reaching Auckland and suffered some heavy damage, Crew Members still often talk about the passage back to New Zealand likening it to being tossed about like a Cork in the heavy Seas.

Aftermath

In Vanuatu, cyclone victims received food and emergency aid following the storm. Australian patrol boat HMAS Cessnock provided manpower assistance to 11 islands in the country. Reconstruction costs in Vanuatu totalled about $5 million (1988 USD), which was about 10 percent of the country's national budget.

After the passage of the storm, four towns in New Zealand declared states of emergency. The New Zealand government provided about $80 million (1988 NZD) to the east coast region of the North Island for assisting in cyclone damage. $8 million was used to create an East Coast Forestry Conservation Scheme, which was set to protect forests and prevent erosion. A study was taken five years after the storm, consisting of a group of 112 people who were evacuated or received monetary assistance in response to the cyclone; the study showed 12% of the respondents as experiencing Posttraumatic stress disorder, of which they reported a general lack of assistance and public support.

See also

Geography of New Zealand
List of tropical cyclones
Cyclone Donna (2017)
Cyclone Hola (2018)
Cyclone Gabrielle (2023) The costliest tropical cyclone on record in the South Pacific basin

Notes

References

External links

Track Map of Severe Tropical Cyclone Bola near Vanuatu, from the Vanuatu Meteorological Service.

Cyclone Bola
Bola 
Cyclone Bola
Bola 
Cyclone Bola
Tropical cyclones in New Zealand
Tropical cyclones in Fiji
Tropical cyclones in Vanuatu
Retired South Pacific cyclones
Category 4 South Pacific cyclones
1987–88 South Pacific cyclone season
1980s in New Zealand
Bola
Floods in New Zealand